Progomphus obscurus, the common sanddragon, is a species of dragonfly in the family Gomphidae, found in eastern United States and southern Ontario.

References

External links
 Progomphus obscurus, BugGuide
 Common Sanddragon (Progomphus obscurus), North Carolina Dragonflies

Gomphidae
Insects described in 1842